The 2015 NCAA Division I women's basketball tournament was played between March and April 2015, with the Final Four played April 5 & 7. The regional locations, after a one-year experiment allowing tournament teams to host, returned to four neutral sites: Oklahoma City, Spokane, Greensboro and Albany. The subregionals were played 20–23 March, while the regionals were played 27–30 March. This represented a change; in the past, the rounds were played starting on a Saturday and ending on a Tuesday. In 2015, the opening rounds and regionals (but not the Final Four) were played starting on a Friday and ending on a Monday. The Final Four was played at Amalie Arena in Tampa, Florida. For only the third time in history, all four of the number one seeds made it to the Final Four.

Tennessee continued its record streak of making every NCAA women's basketball tournament at 34 consecutive appearances. Connecticut also continued its record streak of eight consecutive Final Four appearances.

Tournament procedure

	
Pending any changes to the format, a total of 64 teams will enter the 2016 tournament. 32 automatic bids shall be awarded to each program that wins their conference's tournament. The remaining 36 bids are "at-large", with selections extended by the NCAA Selection Committee. The tournament is split into four regional tournaments, and each regional has teams seeded from 1 to 16, with the committee ostensibly making every region as comparable to the others as possible. The top-seeded team in each region plays the #16 team, the #2 team plays the #15, etc. (meaning where the two seeds add up to 17, that team will be assigned to play another).

The basis for the subregionals returned to the approach used between 1982 and 2002; the top sixteen teams, as chosen in the bracket selection process, hosted the first two rounds on campus.

The Selection Committee will also seed the entire field from 1 to 64.

2015 NCAA Tournament schedule and venues
The subregionals were played from 20–23 March 2015.

The basis for the subregionals returned to the approach used between 1982 and 2002; the top sixteen teams, as chosen in the bracket selection process, hosted the first two rounds on campus. The following sites were selected to host each round of the 2015 tournament:

First and Second Rounds (Subregionals)
20 and 22 March
 Haas Pavilion, Berkeley, California (Host: California)
 Colonial Life Arena, Columbia, South Carolina (Host: South Carolina)
 Gill Coliseum, Corvallis, Oregon (Host: Oregon State)
 Cameron Indoor Stadium, Durham, North Carolina (Host: Duke)
 Carver–Hawkeye Arena, Iowa City, Iowa (Host: Iowa)
 Memorial Coliseum, Lexington, Kentucky (Host: Kentucky)
 Edmund P. Joyce Center, Notre Dame, Indiana (Host: Notre Dame)
 Ferrell Center, Waco, Texas (Host: Baylor)
21 and 23 March
 Carmichael Arena, Chapel Hill, North Carolina (Host: North Carolina)
 Xfinity Center, College Park, Maryland (Host: Maryland)
 Thompson–Boling Arena, Knoxville, Tennessee (Host: Tennessee)
 Maples Pavilion, Stanford, California (Host: Stanford)
 Harry A. Gampel Pavilion, Storrs, Connecticut (Host: Connecticut)
 Donald L. Tucker Civic Center, Tallahassee, Florida (Host: Florida State)
 USF Sun Dome, Tampa, Florida (Host: South Florida)
 Wells Fargo Arena, Tempe, Arizona (Host: Arizona State)

Regional semifinals and finals (Sweet Sixteen and Elite Eight)
27 and 29 March
 Oklahoma City Regional, Chesapeake Energy Arena, Oklahoma City Host: Oklahoma and OKC All Sports Association
 Greensboro Regional, Greensboro Coliseum, Greensboro, North Carolina Host: ACC
28 and 30 March
 Spokane Regional, Spokane Veterans Memorial Arena, Spokane, Washington Host: Washington State 
 Albany Regional, Times Union Center, Albany, New York Host: Siena College MAAC

National semifinals and championship (Final Four and championship)
5 and 7 April 
Amalie Arena, Tampa, Florida, Host: South Florida.

This was the second time that Tampa had hosted a Women's Final Four Basketball tournament; the prior time was in 2008.

Subregionals tournament & automatic qualifiers

Automatic qualifiers
The following teams automatically qualified for the 2015 NCAA field by virtue of winning their conference's tournament (except for the Ivy League, whose regular-season champion received the automatic bid).

Tournament seeds

Tournament records 
 Most three-point field goals—Connecticut hit 54 three-pointers over the course of the tournament, the most ever recorded in a tournament.

Bracket

* – Denotes overtime period

Unless otherwise noted, all times listed are Eastern Daylight Time (UTC−04).

Albany Regional – Albany, New York

First round 

 Alexis Govan and Chastity Gooch combined for 45 points, as Western Kentucky sunk a school record 12 threes, while putting a scare into Texas; however, Texas managed to escape with two free throws from Brooke McCarty with 20.8 seconds remaining to put Texas ahead for good 66–64.  
 Rutgers managed to knock out in-state rival, Seton Hall, behind 21 points each from Kahleah Copper and Tyler Scaife. Rutgers managed to keep Seton Hall to 35.9% shooting; however, the game was largely lost when Seton Hall shot just 12–23 from the Free Throw line, as Daisha Simmons fell to her former team in her penultimate season. 
 Kentucky easily defeated Tennessee State 97–52, with six Wildcats scoring in double digits. After each team scored three points, Kentucky scored 16 consecutive to build a lead they would never relinquish. 
 Dayton pulled out to a seventeen-point lead in the second half. Iowa State cut the lead back to seven points with under three minutes remaining, but could not get any closer, and the Flyers went on to win 78–66. Dayton's Ally Malott scored 18 points and recorded 12 rebounds to help the Flyers win.
 California and Wichita State were tied at eight points each, and Wichita State was within two points with under five minutes to go in the first half, but the Golden Bears opened up a ten-point lead at halftime over the Shockers. Wichita State would get as close to within four points, but California then extended the lead and ended with a twelve-point win 78–66. Cal's Reshanda Gray scored 22 points and left the game to a standing ovation. 
 Connecticut's Morgan Tuck did not play in the prior year's NCAA Tournament, but made up for it in the first game of this year's tournament. She had 20 points in the first half, single-handedly outscoring St. Francis. She ended up hitting 12 of her 13 shots. Sarah Benedetti, who grew up in Canton, Connecticut as a UConn fan, was the high scorer for St. Francis with 13 points. The school was playing tin their first ever NCAA Tournament. The Huskies won with a final score of 89–33.
 Louisville's Myisha Hines-Allen scored 19 points for the Cardinals. Louisville forced 30 turnovers which lead to 38 points, and the Cardinals beat BYU 86–53. 
 Normally, the game between South Florida and LSU would have been held on the court of the 3 seed Louisville but the Cardinals had a scheduling conflict so South Florida hosted. Courtney Williams, playing on her home court had a double-double with 17 points and 11 rebounds, leading her team to a nine-point victory over LSU 73–64.

Second round 

 Kentucky forced 24 turnovers against Dayton, but the Flyers hit 11 three-pointers to help overcome the lost possessions. Kentucky held a three-point lead at halftime, which they opened up to eight points, but Dayton responded. With the score tied at 87 points each with just over a minute to go, Dayton's Kelley Austria hit a three points. Kentucky hit two free throws, then Dayton's Amber Deane hit a three with 30 seconds left in the game. Kentucky was forced to foul but Dayton hit their last six free throw attempts to preserve the upset with a score of 99–94.
 The 4 and 5 seeds, Texas and California, played on Cal's home court. At the end of the half, the two teams were tied. The Longhorns opened the second half with a 12–0 run, but the Golden Bears closed within 4 points with 90 seconds to go in the game. But Kelsey Lang scored at the other end. Imani McGee-Stafford had a double-double for the Longhorns with 20 points and 11 rebounds and Texas held on to win 73–70, sending the team to their first Sweet Sixteen in eleven years.
 When Connecticut and Rutgers took the floor, the two head coaches, Geno Auriemma and C. Vivian Stringer had 1865 combined victories, the most combined victories by any two coaches in an NCAA Tournament game. Playing on Auriemma's birthday, the Scarlet Knights scored the first basket, but that was the last time they would lead in the game. Kaleena Mosqueda-Lewis scored 23, and Moriah Jefferson 19 to lead the Huskies to a 91–55 win.
 The 3 seed Louisville faced the 6 seed South Florida. The first half was close most of the way, with the Cardinals holding on to a slim, five point lead at halftime. Louisville extended the lead to nine in the second half, but the Bulls responded, and took a one-point lead just before the final media time-out of the game. Louisville's Jude Schimmel scored eight points in a three-minute stretch to give the lead back to the Cardinals, and help secure the 60–52 win.

Sweet Sixteen 

 Connecticut had a seven-point lead midway through the first half, when they scored 13 consecutive points against Texas, which they extended into a 44–9 run to blow the game open. Stewart had 31 points as the Huskies rolled to a 105–54 win over the Longhorns. The victory was a milestone for coach Geno Auriemma, representing his 100th victory in the NCAA tournament. He is one of only two coaches, the other being Pat Summitt, with 100 or more victories in the tournament.
 Dayton, the 7 seed, faced Louisville the 3 seed. The Flyers held a slim one point lead at halftime, but outscored the Cardinals by 15 in the second half to win 82–66. Andrea Hoover scored 26 points, including 15 for 15 from the free throw line. It is the first time in regional history that a player with 12 or more attempts was perfect from the line. The Flyers, who had never before made it to a Sweet Sixteen game, moved on to the Elite Eight round.

Elite Eight (Regional Final) 

 Dayton and Connecticut played close to even for the first 20 minutes, with neither team garnering more than a five-point margin. The Huskies had a five-point lead with three minutes to go in the half, but the Flyers scored the next six points to take a lead at halftime, representing the first time the Huskies had been down at the half in two seasons. The Flyers made their first four three-point attempts and hit seven of their first ten shots. In the second half, the Huskies opened with a 15–3 run to take a double-digit lead. On the next possession Kaleena Mosqueda-Lewis hit a three to give her 393 in her career, an NCAA record. The 44 points given up by Connecticut in the first half is the most given up by them in the first half since 2008. Connecticut went on to win 91–70.

Bracket

Regional Final summary

Albany Regional all-tournament team
Breanna Stewart Most Outstanding Player (Connecticut)

Kaleena Mosquera-Lewis (Connecticut)

Moriah Jefferson (Connecticut)

Andrea Hoover (Dayton)

Ally Malott (Dayton)

Spokane Regional – Spokane, Washington

First round 

 Undefeated Princeton came into the game as an 8 seed against the 9 seed Green Bay. The Phoenix had a single point lead at the half, with President Barack Obama in the stands to watch his niece Leslie Robinson, a Princeton forward, although she did not play. The Tigers played better in the second half, and kept their winning streak alive with an 80–70 win. Michelle Miller led Princeton with 20 points, including a perfect 4 of 4 from behind the arc. Miller was supported by a cast which saw five Tigers in double figures, that countered a 21-point effort from Mehryn Kraker. 
 #13 Albany fell just short of stunning #4 Duke. Rebecca Greenwell orchestrated the rescue of Duke's season, as she tallied 20 points, including what proved to be a game winning 3-pointer with just 17 seconds left. Azura Stevens sunk one free throw in order to create the final margin, as Albany fell 54–52. 
 The 3 seed Oregon State played the 14 seed South Dakota State, knowing that a three seed has never lost a first-round game in the NCAA D1 women's tournament. However, the Jackrabbits led much of the first half, as much as by seven points 28–21 with just over five minutes to go in the first half. The Beavers, still trailing at halftime, tied up the game early in the second half and gradually extended the lead to double digits. Oregon State, with 23 points from Sydney Wiese, went on to win 74–62. 
 The 5 seed Mississippi State had a small, five point lead at halftime, but Tulane came back and took a two-point lead early in the second half. The Bulldogs coach, Vic Schaefer, took a timeout and challenged his team to play their best. The responded and took a double digit lead. The Green Wave cut the lead to nine, but could not get closer, and Mississippi State went on to win 57–47. 
 11th seeded Gonzaga opened with the first seven points of the game over 6th seeded George Washington, and later in the first half, went on a 17–1 run to double up the Colonials 38–19. Late in the second half, George Washington cut the lead to six points, but Gonzaga's Sunny Greinacher hit a three-pointer on the next possession to extend the lead the nine points. Gonzaga held on for the upset win 82–69. 
 The top seeded team in the region, Maryland took on the 16 seed New Mexico State. The Terrapins center hit seven of her ten shots from the field and eight of nine from the free throw line. She left the game with just under six minutes left with 22 points, only two points off her career high. Maryland won 75–57 to win a school record 25th consecutive game. Their next opponent, Princeton, is undefeated with a 31-game winning streak. 
 The second seeded Tennessee faced 15 seed Boise State. The Lady Vols had a seven-point lead at halftime which they extended to 13 in the second half but the Broncos cut the lead to five with under three minutes left. Tennessee's Bashaara Graves had a career-high 24 points and the team had a late 8–0 run to preserve the win 72–61.

Second round 

 Fresh off a first round upset, Gonzaga tried to make it two upsets in a row against Oregon State. The Zags had a three-point lead at the half, which they extended to a dozen in the second half, but the Beavers fought back and tied the game at 64 points each on a Jamie Weisner three with three and a half minutes to go in the game. However, that would be the last score for Oregon State as Gonzaga scored the final 12 points of the game to win 76–64.
 Mississippi State, the 5 seed, took on the 4 seed Duke on their home court, but led by four at the half, and extended the lead to six early in the second half. That's when the Blue Devils took over, scoring 12 consecutive points as part of a 26–5 run that put Duke decisively in the lead. Azura Stevens, a freshman for Duke, had a double-double with 22 points and 10 rebounds to help Duke advance with a score of 64–56.
 Princeton brought their undefeated record, and best known fan (President Barack Obama) to take on the 1 Seed Maryland. Despite playing the top seed, the Tigers led by 4 points, 28–24, as late as 14 minutes into the first half. Then the second half started, and the Terrapins hit 56% of their field goal attempts including seven of eight from beyond the arc to take over the game. Maryland ended Princeton's win streak 85–70.
 Tennessee had an 11–0 run early in the first half to open up an early lead and reached halftime with a 12-point margin. Pittsburgh tried for a comeback and got the margin down to four points 69–65. but that occurred with only 38 seconds left in the game. Tennessee's Ariel Massengale hit six consecutive free throws and had a steal to seal the ten point win 77–67.

Sweet Sixteen 
 Maryland faced Duke, the first time the two team have played since Maryland transferred to the Big Ten. The Terrapins' Laurin Mincy scored all of her 15 points in the first half, while Shatori Walker-Kimbrough scored 18 of her 24 points in the second half, to help lead Maryland to a ten-point victory, 65–55, over the Blue Devils.
 Gonzaga had upsets in their first two games, and were looking to make it a third against Tennessee. The Zags had a lead as large as eight points in the first half, but the Lady Vols tied the game at halftime. In the second half, the Zags again took the lead. Tennessee only managed one basket in the first eight minutes of the half, and built a lead which grew to 17 points. The Lady Vols came back, never led, but tied up the game late at 63 points each to send the game to the tournament's first overtime match. Tennessee would not hit a basket in overtime, but hit ten free throws to win the game 73–69.

Elite Eight (Regional Final) 
 Tennessee took an early lead in their game against Maryland, scoring the first 5 points, and led 9–2 six minutes into the game. The Terrapins came back and the teams traded leads in the first half with Maryland taking a one-point lead into halftime. The Lady Vols led by five points early in the second half, then the teams traded leads again. It wasn't until four and a half minutes left in the game that Lexie Brown hit a three-pointer to put Maryland in the lead for good. Tennessee had a chance at tying the game with under a minute to go, but missed a three-pointer. Maryland then sank seven of eight free throws to close the half and win 58–48.

Bracket

Regional Final summary

Spokane Regional all-tournament team
 Shatori Walker-Kimbrough – Maryland – Most Outstanding Player
 Sunny Greinacher – Gonzaga
 Brionna Jones –  Maryland
 Ariel Massengale – Tennessee
 Cierra Burdick – Tennessee

Oklahoma City Regional – Oklahoma City

First round 

 Montana was fourth in the nation in field goal defense, holding their opponents to under 34% on average. However, they were not ready for Notre Dame, who hit 62% of their shots. Jewell Loyd scored 18 points, and the Irish beat the Lady Griz 77–43. 
 The Baylor team watched their men's counterpart lose in an upset to a 14 seed the day before, which filled them with resolve to ensure it did not happen to them. After an early 7–7 tie, they went on a 14–2 run to open up a large lead against Northwestern State they would never relinquish. The Lady Bears held the Lady Demons to 24% shooting from the field and won easily, 77–36.
 Although the 3 seed Iowa started out 8–2 against the 14 seed American on their home court, the Eagles responded and led by as many as five in the first half. The Hawkeyes responded and tied the game up at the half. The second half would remain close, but Iowa took a lead that they never gave up, and ended with an eight-point win 75–67. 
 Arkansas was the 10 seed, playing under first year coach Jimmy Dykes, a former Razorback. Arkansas led 9–2 early but Northwestern tied it up and the team remained close until tied at half-time. Northwestern scored the first six points of the second half, and extended the lead out to 13 just before the midpoint of the half, but the Razorbacks came back. The game was tied at 55 points each when, with 30 seconds left, Jessica Jackson hit one of two free throws. Each team would have additional chances, but no more baskets would be scored, only an additional free throw with two seconds left in the game to give Arkansas the upset 57–55.
 Third seed Stanford had all they could handle playing the 14 seed Cal State Northridge. Playing on Stanford's home court, Maples Arena, Stanford opened up a ten-point lead in the first half, but then went scoreless for eight minutes. The Matadors held a one-point lead at halftime, and extended the lead to six in the second half. Then the Cardinal scored eight straight points to take a lead they would never give up. Stanford won 73–60.
 12 seed Quinnipiac came into their game against Oklahoma on a 21-game winning streak, but had not played a team with the speed and size of the Sooners. Oklahoma had a 17-point lead at halftime. The Bobcats would cut the lead to seven, but the Sooners took over and won 111–84.
 Miami was the 11 seed, but they had beaten one of the top seeds, Notre Dame, in the regular season, so they had the talent to play with the best. The Hurricanes Adrienne Motley scored 30 points, while the Washington Huskies best scorers Kelsey Plum and Jazmine Davis were a combined 10 for 30 from the field. The Huskies got to within three points in the second half, but Miami held on to win 86–80.
 DePaul took on Minnesota in the 8–9 game. Despite being down by double digits at halftime, The Blue Demons coach, Doug Bruno, thought his team was in a good place; that they had exhausted the Golden Gophers. Minnesota's  Amanda Zahui B. recorded 22 rebounds, one off the NCAA record, along with 21 points, but it was not enough, and DePaul came back to win the game 79–72.

Second round 

 DePaul opened with a press against the top seed Notre Dame and was initially successful, forcing four turnovers in the first five possessions, but the Irish settled down and opened up a six-point lead in the first half, which they doubled in the second half. Notre Dame's Michaela Mabrey scored 19 points, including five of seven three-point shots to help lead the Irish to the 79–67 win over the Blue Demons.
 Arkansas played roughly even with Baylor in the beginning of the game, with three ties and ten lead changes and were still holding onto a lead nine minutes into the half. But the Lady Bears ended the half on a 30–7 run to reach a 20-point lead, and expanded the lead by nine more points in the second half. Baylor won the game over the Razorbacks, 73–44.
 Iowa faced Miami in the second round, knowing they had failed to reach the Sweet Sixteen in their last seven tries. However, in many of those games, the Hawkeyes were an 8 or 9 seed, and went on to play the top seed in the region. This year, Iowa was a 3 seed, facing the 11th-seeded Hurricanes. The Hawkeyes hit 2/3 of their shots in the second half, extending a seven-point halftime lead to 17 and won the game 88–70.
 Oklahoma led Stanford by four points at the end of the first half, a half in which Stanford's Bonnie Samuelson failed to score. She made up for that in the second half, scoring 19 points. That, along with Amber Orrange's 24 points helped the Cardinal beat the Sooners by ten points, 86–76, sending Stanford to their eighth consecutive Sweet Sixteen.

Sweet Sixteen
 Baylor's Sune Agbuke had a scoring average of just under six points per game and a career high of 16 points, but she scored 23 points for the Bears. Teammate Nina Davis contributed 20 points, and Iowa fell to Baylor 81–66. Iowa's Samantha Logic had a triple double with 13 points, 10 rebounds and 14 assists for the Hawkeyes, but it was not enough.
 Hall of Fame coaches Tara VanDerveer and Muffet McGraw had never before met in the post-season, and the two teams, Stanford and Notre Dame, had only met twice previously, with Stanford winning in 1990 and 1991. Notre Dame's Lindsay Allen, who averages just under ten points a game, matched her career high of 24 in the first half, and ended with 28 points. Jewell Loyd scored 21, and the Irish ended up with a double-digit lead by halftime, and extended the lead by ten more to win 81–60.

Elite Eight (Regional Final) 

 Notre Dame and Baylor, the one and two seeds in the region, faced off for the opportunity to go to the Final Four. Baylor led early, but as much as nine points 26–17, in the first half but the Irish came back to take a two-point lead at halftime. The Bears retook the lead in the second half, and were still leading at the second media timeout with 12 minutes to go in the game when Jewell Loyd made a layup to give the Irish a lead they would not relinquish. Notre Dame ended with the win 77–68.

Bracket

Regional Final summary

Oklahoma City Regional all-tournament team
 Lindsay Allen – Notre Dame – Most Outstanding Player
 Nina Davis – Baylor
 Jewell Loyd – Notre Dame
 Samantha Logic – Iowa 
 Niya Johnson – Baylor

Greensboro Regional – Greensboro, North Carolina

First round 
 Despite leading by 13 points at the end of the first half, South Carolina's coach Dawn Staley was not happy with the team's performance. Aleighsa Welch urged her teammates to "do something about it" and the team put together a 21–1 run early in the second half to put Savannah State away. The Gamecocks won, 81–48.
 Syracuse and Nebraska were the 8th and 9th seeds, meaning the selection committee viewed them as comparable. They lived up to expectations, reaching the end of the first half tied. The go-ahead basket was scored by Syracuse with less than a minute remaining in the game, and the Orange defeated the Cornhuskers, 72–69.
 Florida State opened up an 18-point lead over Alabama State by halftime, and continued to extend the lead in the second half. The Seminoles forced 32 turnovers, including 18 steals which led to a 91–49 win, resulting in the first-ever 30-win season by Florida State.
 Arizona State played a home game in the NCAA tournament for the first time in a decade, opening up a 16-point lead by halftime. The Sun Devils' Katie Hempen scored 23 points, a career high, and Sophie Brunner added 14 points, as Arizona State extended the lead in the second half against Ohio. Although the Bobcats were a good three-point shooting team, they converted only 4 of 16 attempts. Arizona State beat Ohio by 19, 74–55.
 The 4th seed North Carolina had a lead of 14 points at halftime over the 13th seed Liberty, but the Flames used a 52–35 rebounding advantage to make the game closer in the second half. Liberty cut the lead to six points, but were unable to close the gap, and failed to win their first ever NCAA Tournament game. North Carolina held on to win, 71–65.
 The game between Florida Gulf Coast and Oklahoma State was a rematch of a 2014 NCAA Tournament first-round game. In the prior game Oklahoma State prevailed 61–60 in overtime. This year the Eagles would get their revenge, behind 26 points from Kaneisha Atwater and 19 from Whitney Knight, as FGCU won their 26th consecutive game by a score of 75–67, the third-longest active streak in NCAA DI women's basketball.
 The 11th seed Arkansas-Little Rock took on the 6th seed Texas A&M. The first half was close, with the Aggies taking a one-point lead into halftime. In a second half fueled by 25 points from  Taylor Gault and 22 points from Kiera Clark, they took the lead and extended it to win by nine points, 69–60. The Aggies' Courtney Williams recorded a double-double, with 23 points and eleven rebounds but without teammate Jordan Jones, it was not enough. The win was the 700th for Trojans' coach Joe Foley.
 The 5 seed Ohio State took on the 12 seed James Madison. The Buckeyes pushed the lead to double digits several times in the second half, but the Dukes cut the lead back to single digits, and were as close as four points with just over eight minutes to go. Ameryst Alston scored 28 points, Kelsey Mitchell  23 and Alexa Hart 20 for Ohio State. The Buckeyes ended with a ten-point margin, 90–80.

Second round 
 South Carolina faced Syracuse in a rematch of a game played earlier in the season. In that game, played in the Junkanoo Jam in the Bahamas, the Orange opened up a double-digit lead in the second half, before The Gamecocks responded and finished with a four-point win. This game proceeded very differently, with South Carolina leading by 28 points at the half. While the second half was roughly even the Gamecocks were too far ahead and won the game, 97–68.
 Florida Gulf Coast brought a 26-game winning streak to their match-up with Florida State, but the Seminoles were "...too big, too fast and too deep...". Florida State opened with a 17–2 run, held the Eagles to 31% shooting and a season low 47 points, and won the game, 65–47.
 After their upset in the first round, Arkansas-Little Rock took on a higher-ranked opponent in Arizona State, and initially appeared headed to another upset. The Trojans led by 16 points in the second half and by ten with under eight minutes to go. The Sun Devils slowly cut into the lead, and took their first lead since leading 2–0 with under a minute to go, on Sophie Brunner's layup. The teams traded baskets, then with seven seconds remaining in the game Katie Hempen was fouled and sank two free throws to extend the lead to three points. Alexius Dawn missed a three-pointer with a second left in the game, and Arizona State completed the comeback, 57–54.
 North Carolina took on Ohio State and pulled out to a lead as large as 23 points, before giving up the lead late in the game. OSU's Kelsey Mitchell hit a three-pointer to tie up the game with 44 seconds left, and after the Tar Heels responded with a basket, hit two free throws to tie the game again. North Carolina's Jamie Cherry hit a jumper with one second left on the clock to preserve the 86–84 victory.

Sweet Sixteen 
 In the 2014 Tournament, South Carolina, as a 1 seed, faced North Carolina as a 4 seed in a Sweet Sixteen match up. North Carolina upset South Carolina in that game. This year, South Carolina was again a 1 seed and North Carolina a 4 seed, and they faced each other in a Sweet Sixteen match-up. With a minute and a half to go in the game, the Tar Heels had a three-point lead, and with under 20 seconds to go, the game was tied. The Gamecocks Tiffany Mitchell made a layup with five seconds to go in the game to prevent another upset. South Carolina won 67–65.
 In the first half, Florida State and Arizona State played even for the first seventeen minutes of the half. With just over three minutes to go in the half, the Sun Devils tied the game at 22 points each, but would not score again in the half, and the Seminoles would reach halftime with a ten-point lead. In the second half, the Sun Devils came back to within a single point when Elisha Davis hit a three-pointer with six seconds left. They would get the ball once more time, but the Seminoles' Maegan Conwright stole the ball on a final drive to the basket. Florida State won, behind a career-high 21 points from Leticia Romero 66–65.

Elite Eight (regional final) 
 The top two seeds in the Greensboro regional, South Carolina and Florida State, met in the regional final. The Gamecocks hit 61% of their field goal attempt, but despite the excellent shooting, did not take a lead until about nine minutes were left in the second half. South Carolina's Tiffany Mitchell put her team ahead for good with two minutes to go, and scored seven points in the final two minutes. South Carolina won 80–74 to advance them to their first ever Final Four.

Bracket

Regional Final summary

Greensboro Regional all-tournament team
 Alaina Coates – South Carolina – Most Outstanding Player
 Latifah Coleman – North Carolina
 Adut Bulgak – Florida State
 Leticia Romero – Florida State
 Tiffany Mitchell – South Carolina

Final Four
During the Final Four round, regardless of the seeds of the participating teams, the champion of the top overall top seed's region plays against the champion of the fourth-ranked top seed's region, and the champion of the second overall top seed's region plays against the champion of the third-ranked top seed's region. The committee placed the four No. 1 seeded teams 1 through 4 in each of the four regions, thus determining the Final Four semifinals pairings.

Amalie Arena — Tampa, Florida

Game Summaries

Final four

National Championship

Final Four all-tournament team

Record by conference

The R64, R32, S16, E8, F4, CG, NC columns indicate how many teams from each conference were in the round of 64 (second round), round of 32 (third round), Sweet 16, Elite Eight, Final Four, championship game, and national champion, respectively.
The America East, Big Sky, Big South, Big West, CAA, C-USA, Horizon, MAAC, MAC, MEAC, MVC, NW, NEC, OVC, Patriot, SoCon, Southland, SWAC, Summit, and WAC each had one representative, eliminated in the first round with a record of 0–1.

All-Tournament Team 
 Breanna Stewart, Connecticut
 Morgan Tuck, Connecticut
 Moriah Jefferson, Connecticut
 Brianna Turner, Notre Dame
 Jewell Loyd, Notre Dame

Game Officials 
 Lisa Mattingly (semifinal)
 Felicia Grinter (semifinal)
 Bryan Brunette (semifinal)
 Joe Vaszily (semifinal)
 Eric Brewton (semifinal)
 Maj Forsberg (semifinal)
 Dee Kanter (final)
 Denise Brooks (final)
 Mark Zentz (final)
Penny Davis (Standby)

Media coverage

Television
ESPN had US television rights to all games during the tournament. For the first and second round, ESPN aired select games nationally on ESPN, ESPNU, or ESPNews. All other games aired regionally on ESPN, ESPN2, or ESPN3 and were streamed online via WatchESPN. Most of the nation got whip-a-round coverage during this time, which allowed ESPN to rotate between the games and focus the nation on the one that had the closest score. The regional semifinals were split between ESPN and ESPN2, and ESPN aired the regional finals, national semifinals, and championship match. Coverage began with the selection show on Monday, March 12, 2015.

Studio host & analysts
Kevin Negandhi (Host)
Kara Lawson (Analyst)
Rebecca Lobo (Analyst)

Broadcast Assignments

First & Second Rounds Friday/Sunday
Tiffany Greene & LaChina Robinson – Durham, North Carolina
Brenda VanLengen & Carol Ross – Lexington, Kentucky
Clay Matvick & Katie Smith – Iowa City, Iowa
Fran Harris & Nell Fortner – Waco, Texas
Beth Mowins & Stephanie White – Notre Dame, Indiana
Pam Ward & Carolyn Peck – Columbia, South Carolina
Cara Capuano & Steffi Sorensen – Corvallis, Oregon
Melissa Lee & Mary Murphy – Berkeley, California
Sweet Sixteen & Elite Eight Friday/Sunday
Beth Mowins, Stephanie White, & Maria Taylor – Greensboro, North Carolina
Pam Ward, Carolyn Peck, & LaChina Robinson – Oklahoma City, Oklahoma
Final Four
Dave O'Brien, Doris Burke, & Holly Rowe – Tampa, Florida

First & Second Rounds Saturday/Monday
Paul Sunderland & Gail Goestenkors – Knoxville, Tennessee
Dave O'Brien & Doris Burke – College Park, Maryland
Marc Kestecher & Christy Winters-Scott – Chapel Hill, North Carolina
Mark Jones & Sue Bird – Tallahassee, Florida
Bob Picozzi & Brooke Weisbrod – Tampa, Florida
Dave Pasch & Debbie Antonelli – Tempe, Arizona
Dave Flemming & Sean Farnham – Stanford, California
Bob Wischusen & LaPhonso Ellis – Storrs, Connecticut
Sweet Sixteen & Elite Eight Saturday/Monday
Dave O'Brien, Doris Burke, & Holly Rowe – Albany, New York
Dave Pasch, Debbie Antonelli, & Allison Williams – Spokane, Washington
Championship
Dave O'Brien, Doris Burke, & Holly Rowe – Tampa, Florida

Radio
Westwood One had exclusive radio rights to the entire tournament. Teams participating in the Regional Finals, Final Four, and championship were allowed to have their own local broadcasts, but they were not allowed to stream those broadcasts online.

Regional Finals Sunday
Amy Lawrence & Ann Meyers Drysdale – Oklahoma City, Oklahoma
Craig Way & Brenda VanLengen – Greensboro, North Carolina
Final Four
John Sadak, Debbie Antonelli, & Krista Blunk – Tampa, Florida

Regional Finals Monday
John Sadak & Swin Cash – Albany, New York
Dick Fain & Krista Blunk – Spokane, Washington
Championship
John Sadak, Debbie Antonelli, & Krista Blunk – Tampa, Florida

See also
 2015 NCAA Division I men's basketball tournament
 2015 NAIA Division I women's basketball tournament
 2015 Women's National Invitation Tournament
 2015 NCAA Women's Division III basketball tournament
UConn–Notre Dame rivalry

References

External links
NCAA Women's Basketball Division I

NCAA tournament
NCAA Division I women's basketball tournament
Basketball in Tampa, Florida
NCAA Division I women's basketball tournament
NCAA Division I women's basketball tournament
NCAA Division I women's basketball tournament
21st century in Tampa, Florida
Basketball in Waco, Texas